Robert Gordon Grevett (24 November 1914 – 5 March 2004) was an English cricketer. Grevett was a right-handed batsman who bowled right-arm off break. He was born at Eastbourne, Sussex.

Grevett made a single first-class appearance for Sussex against Oxford University at The Saffrons, Eastbourne, in 1939. Oxford University won the toss and elected to bat, scoring 178 in their first-innings. In response, Sussex made 169 in their first-innings, with Grevett, who batted at number three, being dismissed for a duck by David Macindoe. Oxford University made 324 in their second-innings, leaving Sussex with a target of 334 to win. However, Sussex could only make 277 in their second-innings chase, with Grevett once again dismissed for a duck, this time off the bowling of Algernon Marsham. This was his only major appearance for Sussex.

He died at Chertsey, Surrey, on 5 March 2004. His uncle, William Grevett, also played a single first-class match for Sussex.

References

External links
Robert Grevett at ESPNcricinfo
Robert Grevett at CricketArchive

1914 births
2004 deaths
Sportspeople from Eastbourne
English cricketers
Sussex cricketers